D514 is a state road in Slavonia region of Croatia, connecting A3 motorway Slavonski Brod istok (east) interchange to D53 state road and Slavonski Brod. The road is 2.7 km long.

As the road passes through an urban zone, it comprises a substantial number of street intersections, some of which are regulated by traffic lights.

The road, as well as all other state roads in Croatia, is managed and maintained by Hrvatske Ceste, state owned company.

Traffic volume 

The D514 state road traffic volume is not reported by Hrvatske Ceste. However, they regularly count and report traffic volume on the A3 motorway Slavonski Brod istok (east) interchange, which connects to the D514 road only, thus permitting the D514 road traffic volume to be accurately calculated. The report includes no information on ASDT volumes.

Road junctions and populated areas

See also
 A3 motorway

Sources

State roads in Croatia
Brod-Posavina County